2016 Thai Football Division 3 Tournament Central Region  is the 1st season of the League competition since its establishment in 2016. It is in the fourth tier of the Thai football league system.

Venue Stadium and locations (2016) 
All matches played in Nong Chok National Football Center Nong Chok, Bangkok

Member clubs

Format 
Group stage: A total 54 clubs will be divided into four groups of three clubs except group 18 which has four clubs to play round-robin matches at a neutral venue. The best clubs of group A and G qualify to Quarter-finals round of the knock-out stage. The best clubs of group B, C, E, F, G and H, The best two clubs of group A, D, I, J, K, L, M, N, O, P, Q and R will qualify to third round of the knock-out stage. Runner-up of group E, F, G and H will qualify to second round of the knock-out stage.

Knock-out stage: A total of 18 clubs which has qualified from the group stage will play single-elimination stage until there are only two finalists of the tournament.

Result

First round

Group A

Group B

Group C

Group D

Group E

Group F

Group G

Group H

Group I

Group J

Group K

Group L

Group M

Group N

Group O

Group P

Group Q

Group R

Second round

Third round

Fourth round

Quarter-finals Round

Semi-finals Round

Final round

Winner

See also 

2016 Thai Division 3 Tournament Northern Region
2016 Thai Division 3 Tournament North Eastern Region
2016 Thai Division 3 Tournament Eastern Region
2016 Thai Division 3 Tournament Southern Region

References

External links
 http://www.thailandsusu.com/webboard/index.php?topic=375896.0
 https://web.archive.org/web/20160922134240/http://fathailand.org/archives/9792
 https://web.archive.org/web/20161227055655/http://fathailand.org/archives/15635
 http://www.thailandsusu.com/webboard/index.php?topic=378874.0
 ฟุตบอลดิวิชัน 3 ฤดูกาล 2559

Central
2016 in Thai football leagues